Caupolicán Peña Reyes (born 15 September 1930) is a Chilean former footballer and manager. He is considered one of the greatest players in Colo-Colo history.

Honours

Club

Player
Colo-Colo
 Primera División de Chile (3): 1953, 1956, 1958
 Copa Chile (1): 1960

Manager
Palestino
 Copa Chile (1): 1977
 Primera División de Chile (1): 1978

References

1930 births
Chilean Primera División players
Colo-Colo footballers
Chilean football managers
Chilean Primera División managers
Colo-Colo managers
Green Cross managers
Ñublense managers
O'Higgins F.C. managers
Huachipato managers
Deportes La Serena managers
Club Deportivo Palestino managers
Chile national football team managers
Everton de Viña del Mar managers
Audax Italiano managers
Living people
Association football midfielders
Chilean footballers
Chile international footballers